The women's road race C1-3 cycling event at the 2020 Summer Paralympics took place on 3 September 2021, at the Fuji Speedway in Shizuoka Prefecture. 15 riders competed in the event.

The event covers the following three classifications, that all use standard bicycles:
C1: cyclists with severe hemiplegic or diplegic spasticity; severe athetosis or ataxia; bilateral through knee amputation, etcetera.
C2: cyclists with moderate hemiplegic or diplegic spasticity; moderate athetosis or ataxia; unilateral above-knee amputation, etcetera.
C3: cyclists with moderate hemiplegic or diplegic spasticity; moderate athetosis or ataxia; bilateral below-knee or unilateral through knee amputation, etcetera.

Results
The event took place on 3 September 2021 at 9:35.

References

Women's road race C1-3